Crambus sinicolellus is a moth in the family Crambidae. It was described by Aristide Caradja in 1926. It is found in Jiangsu, China.

References

Crambini
Moths described in 1926
Moths of Asia